Janelle K. Sarauw is a Virgin Islander politician and former educator who served as senator in the Legislature of the Virgin Islands from the St. Thomas-St. John District, from 2017 to 2023. She is the first openly LGBT woman to serve in the territory’s legislature. Sarauw ran for Lieutenant Governor in the 2022 election.

Early life and education
Janelle K. Sarauw was born on St. Thomas to Levron Sarauw Sr. of Frederiksted, St. Croix and Carla Buchanan of Cayon, St. Kitts. The youngest of two children, Sarauw graduated from the Charlotte Amalie High School in 2003. Sarauw attended Florida Atlantic University, where she earned a bachelor’s degree in political science. She also received her master’s degree in Organizational leadership at Gonzaga University.

Career
Sarauw taught U.S. history at Charlotte Amalie High School from 2007 to 2010. She joined the Department of Sports, Parks and Recreation to be a Sports coordinator. Prior to becoming a senator, Sarauw was an Assistant chief researcher for the Lieutenant Governor office and worked as a part-time professor on political science at the University of the Virgin Islands.

Legislative career
Sarauw was sworn in as the 15th member of the 32nd Legislature on July 14, 2017.

2016 election
Sarauw ran for the Senate ending up in 8th place. On December 9, 2016, Sarauw and campaign volunteer, Brigitte Berry filed a complaint in the Superior Court against Kevin Rodríquez, St. Thomas & St. John Board of Elections, Virgin Islands Board of Elections and Supervisor of Elections Caroline F. Fawkes. They alleged that Rodríquez was not qualified to serve in the legislature because he hadn’t been "a bona fide resident of the Virgin Islands for at least three years next preceding the date of his election."

2017 special election
Sarauw won a special election receiving 1,292 votes over former Senator Justin Harrigan Sr. who came in second place with 900 votes.

2018 election
Sarauw won re-election with 5,339 votes.

2020 election
Sarauw won re-election coming in second place with 4,827 votes.

Committee assignments
32nd Legislature 
 Committee on Rules and Judiciary
 Committee on Education and Workforce Development 
 Committee on Consumer Affairs and Culture
 Committee on Youth, Sports, Parks and Recreation

33rd Legislature
 Committee on Rules and Judiciary (Chair)

34th Legislature
 Committee on Housing, Transportation, and Telecommunications
  Committee on Health, Hospitals and Human Services
 Committee on Education and Workforce Development (Vice Chair)
 Committee on Disaster Recovery and Infrastructure (Chair)
 Committee on Finance
 Committee on the Whole 
 Subcommittee on Energy and Infrastructure Development (Chair)

Lieutenant gubernatorial campaign
In May 2022, Sarauw was chosen by fellow senator Kurt Vialet to be his running mate in the 2022 gubernatorial election.

Personal life
Sarauw was crowned St. Thomas Carnival Queen in 2003.

References

1985 births
21st-century American politicians
Democratic Party of the Virgin Islands politicians
Living people
Senators of the Legislature of the United States Virgin Islands